Revaz Lashkhi (born 26 May 1988 in Borjomi, Georgia) is a Georgian Greco-Roman wrestler, who competed at the 2012 Summer Olympics and won a silver medal in the men's Greco-Roman 60 kg category.  He beat Sayed Abdelmoneim, then Zaur Kuramagomedov in the quarterfinal and Həsən Əliyev in the semi-final before losing to Omid Norouzi in the final.

References

External links
 

Wrestlers at the 2012 Summer Olympics
Male sport wrestlers from Georgia (country)
Olympic wrestlers of Georgia (country)
Living people
1988 births
Olympic medalists in wrestling
Olympic silver medalists for Georgia (country)
Medalists at the 2012 Summer Olympics
People from Borjomi